The Domination of the Draka (also called the Draka series or the Draka saga) is a dystopian science fiction alternate history series by American author S. M. Stirling. 

It comprises a main trilogy of novels as well as one crossover novel set after the original and a book of short stories.

The series focuses on Draka (later The Domination), a totalitarian, expansionist nation founded in Southern Africa by British settlers in the 18th century where cruel slavery plays an increasingly central role.

Novels

Fictional universe

The world of the Domination diverges when the Dutch Republic joins the American Revolutionary War and is forced to cede the Cape Colony to the British. Renamed after Francis Drake, the Crown Colony of Drakia (later Dominion and finally Domination of the Draka) becomes a haven for American loyalists, Hessian mercenaries, Icelandic refugees, French royalists, and later German and Confederate expatriates, who overrun and assimilate the earlier Boer population. With its capital at Archona, the Draka develop into a militaristic slave-owning society controlled by a hereditary plantation aristocracy. Other societal groups include a technocratic subclass of industrialists, a small Boer-dominated navy, and a secret police controlled by Confederate immigrant families.

Draka culture draws inspiration from the Mughal Empire as well as classical antiquity. English is the only tolerated language; the Draka accent is described as difficult for foreign spies to imitate, with some Afrikaans influence. The economy is heavily dominated by cartels known as Combines, though there is also a considerable small-business private sector. Most of the small minority of free Draka citizens own slaves, which comprise 90% of the population; slaves have no rights and are treated ruthlessly to prevent rebellion. Politically, the Draka state is ruled by a parliament elected by the citizens, which in turn appoints the Archon, or head of state. Citizens have a considerable degree of free speech, but fundamental criticism of the slave system is forbidden. 

While originally slaves are black Africans and citizenship is open to all whites, over time the Draka begin to see themselves as the master race, with all non-Draka as threats to be subjugated. Due to a societal fixation on military training from infancy, Draka citizen soldiers are supposedly the equal of several elite enemy soldiers; they give no quarter in combat and prefer death to capture. The rest of the army is filled out by slave troops, who are less well-equipped but still formidable. Having leveraged conquered natural resources to offer research grants and incentives, Draka technology is shown to progress more rapidly than in reality; their military equipment is several decades ahead of their opponents, and by later books in the series includes genetically modified animals, combat spacecraft, and advanced computer viruses.

Over the course of the 19th century, the Draka conquer and enslave all of Africa, starting with Egypt during the Napoleonic Wars and ending with the Congo. Other world powers are likewise much more expansionist in this timeline, with Brazil seizing much of South America, Gran Colombia never breaking up, and the United States eventually annexing all of North America as well as Spain's Caribbean and Pacific possessions. Massive Draka aid to the Confederacy fails to avert a Union victory. The Taiping Rebellion succeeds, but a weakened China soon cedes large territories and eventually becomes a protectorate of Japan. Joining the Allies of World War I, the Draka seize Ottoman and Bulgarian lands and then much of Central Asia from China, Afghanistan, and the collapsing Russian Empire.

Plot summary

The first book of the series, Marching Through Georgia, is set during the Eurasian War. The Soviet Union, weakened by civil war and the Draka incursion, collapses to the Nazi invasion before a Draka attack falls on the German army in the Caucasus. While both sides' weaponry is somewhat more advanced than historically, with jet and rocket aircraft and advanced armored vehicles, that of the Draka proves superior. Since most European countries are loath to unite behind the Germans, the Draka are eventually able to conquer all of mainland Europe. Meanwhile, having already subdued what remains of China, Japanese forces are able to concentrate on the United States, seizing its Pacific possessions and raiding North America. The U.S. does not open a second front in Europe and eventually turns the tide against Japan. The Draka invade Japanese-occupied China and Korea, and the war ends in 1945 with multiple German and Japanese cities and bases destroyed by nuclear weapons. The remaining countries of the world join the Alliance for Democracy, with the United Kingdom inundated with refugees and heavily fortified against potential Draka attack.

The second book, Under the Yoke, shows Europe under Draka rule. The Draka, having applied modern science to the practice of slavery, ruthlessly crush resistance and obliterate old institutions, including the use of a thermonuclear weapon on the rebelling city of Barcelona. The third book, The Stone Dogs, depicts the cold war between the Draka and the Alliance, fought mostly on interplanetary colonies throughout the inner Solar System, and Alliance efforts to recruit Draka defectors.

In the 1970s, the exposure of an Alliance covert operation against a Hindu nationalist party leads to India seceding from the Alliance, after which it is conquered and enslaved by the Draka. Even so, long-term trends are depicted as favoring the Alliance; its larger economy and free population give it an advantage in physics and computer research. Both sides build a superweapon for the expected final war; the Alliance creates a sophisticated computer virus, and secretly constructs a starship for escaping to Alpha Centauri. Draka has more advanced biological sciences; by experimenting on slave subjects, Draka geneticists develop a virus known as "The Stone Dogs." To prevent losing the virus's secrecy, the Domination uses it preemptively on the Alliance. In a war costing hundreds of millions of lives, the Alliance is narrowly defeated; a truce allows them to launch the starship. The Draka take over the rest of Earth, now devastated by a years-long nuclear winter, and eventually produce a new species of human that is genetically engineered for servility, as well as unable to breed with the Draka "Master Race." Only a few isolated groups of baseline humans are said to survive.

The fourth novel, Drakon, starts in 2442 when research into wormhole technology, needed to bridge the gap between Earth and the Alliance refugee colony at Alpha Centauri, ends up sending a single Draka and a pursuing Alliance agent into an alternate 1995–2000 where the Draka never existed. In the original timeline, the Draka barely beat back a wormhole-enabled Alliance assault from Alpha Centauri, while in the alternate timeline, the agent manages to prevent the Draka from reopening the wormhole and invading. Using technology captured from the interlopers, this Earth begins preparing for the next appearance of the Draka.

Criticism

The series has been criticized on the internet for being historically and technologically implausible. When asked about these criticisms in an interview, Stirling answered:

There's a small internet industry of 'proving' that the Domination couldn't happen. I consider this a complement . How many people go on at great length trying to prove that vampires and werewolves don't exist?

Stirling's use of the Draka as point-of-view characters has led to accusations that he has some sympathy with them (for example, in his entry in The Encyclopedia of Science Fiction), to his dismay. He describes the Draka series as dystopias based on "suppos[ing that] everything had turned out as badly as possible, these last few centuries."

References

External links
 
 Historical Timeline of the Domination
 The Draka Appendices
 Draka Section on Stirling's Website 

Book series introduced in 1988
American alternate history novels
Alternate history book series
Dystopian novels
Science fiction book series
Novel series
The Domination series
Works about slavery